The 2012 German Darts Masters was the fourth of five PDC European Tour events on the 2012 PDC Pro Tour. The tournament took place at the Glaspalast in Sindelfingen, Germany, from 7–9 September 2012. It featured a field of 64 players and £82,100 in prize money, with £15,000 going to the winner.

Adrian Lewis claimed his first European Tour title with a 6–3 win over Ian White.

There were two nine-dart finishes during the tournament. Mark Webster hit the first during his first-round game, which he lost to Andree Welge, and Ian White hit the second during his 6–5 last 16 victory against Andy Hamilton.

Prize money

Qualification
The top 32 players from the PDC Order of Merit automatically qualified for the event. The remaining 32 places went to players from three qualifying events - 20 from the UK Qualifier (held in Derby on August 3), eight from the European Qualifier (held in Berlin on August 4), and four from the Home Nation Qualifier (also held in Berlin on August 3).

Gary Anderson was banned from playing in this tournament, along with the Dutch Darts Masters and the European Championship. Also, Jelle Klaasen, Phil Taylor and Mark Hylton did not compete, with their opponents (Steve Beaton, Andy Jenkins and Jerry Hendriks respectively) receiving byes to the second round.

1–32

UK Qualifier
  Tony Littleton (second round)
  Darren Johnson (first round)
  Nick Fullwell (first round)
  Jamie Lewis (first round)
  Arron Monk (second round)
  Ian White (runner-up)
  Nigel Heydon (third round)
  William O'Connor (second round)
  Mark Dudbridge (first round)
  Andrew Gilding (first round)
  Peter Hudson (second round)
  Darren Webster (first round)
  Mickey Mansell (third round)
  Dean Winstanley (first round)
  Andy Jenkins (second round)
  Tony West (quarter-finals)
  Stuart Kellett (second round)
  James Richardson (second round)
  Reece Robinson (first round)
  Terry Temple (second round)

European Qualifier
  Jelle Klaasen (withdrew)
  Mensur Suljović (first round)
  Tonči Restović (first round)
  Leon de Geus (first round)
  Kurt van de Rijck (first round)
  Kim Huybrechts (second round)
  Magnus Caris (second round)
  Jerry Hendriks (third round)

Host Nation Qualifier
  Tomas Seyler (first round)
  Andree Welge (third round)
  Kevin Münch (first round)
  Maik Langendorf (first round)

Draw

References

2012 PDC European Tour
2012 in German sport